Daryl Macon Jr. (born November 29, 1995) is an American professional basketball player for UNICS Kazan of the VTB United League. He played college basketball for Holmes Community College and the Arkansas Razorbacks.

College career
Macon began his college basketball career at Holmes Community College, where he was named a junior college All-American after averaging 23 points, 4.1 rebounds and 3.1 assists per game as a freshman. He was named to the NJCAA Division I Men's Basketball Third Team All-America as a sophomore.  He transferred to Arkansas Razorbacks, spurning offers from Ole Miss, Mississippi State, Memphis and UMass.

As a junior, Macon was second on the team in scoring, averaging 13.4 points, 2.6 rebounds, 2.2 assists and 1.1 steals per game. He was named to the All-SEC Tournament team and earned SEC Player of the Week honors in February 2017 after posting 30 points against Ole Miss. After the season, he declared for the 2017 NBA draft but did not hire an agent and ultimately returned to Arkansas.

As a senior, he was named to the Second Team All-SEC. Macon averaged 17.1 points and 4.0 assists per game and led the SEC in three-point shooting at a 43.8 percent clip. He was named SEC Player of the Week three times as a senior and joined teammate Jaylen Barford in the 1,000-point club on senior night.

Professional career

Dallas Mavericks & Texas Legends (2018–2019)
After going undrafted in the 2018 NBA Draft, Macon received contract offers from several NBA teams as well as overseas clubs. He joined the Miami Heat for the NBA Summer League. He signed a two-way contract with the Dallas Mavericks on July 30, 2018, splitting time between the Mavericks and their G League affiliate the Texas Legends. In his first game with the Legends, Macon scored 35 points on 12-of-18 shooting as the Legends defeated the Austin Spurs 126–120. Macon made his NBA debut on October 26, 2018 against the Toronto Raptors, playing one minute and scoring no points in the Mavericks' 107–116 loss.

On July 26, 2019, Macon was waived by the Mavericks.

Miami Heat & Sioux Falls Skyforce (2019–2020)
On September 20, 2019, Macon signed an Exhibit 10 contract with the Miami Heat. On October 19, after training camp, the Heat converted Macon's deal to a two-way contract with their G League affiliate, the Sioux Falls Skyforce. On January 8, 2020, the Miami Heat waived Macon. On January 16, 2020, the Sioux Falls Skyforce announced that they had acquired Macon via returning player right. Macon averaged 17.0 points and 4.7 assists per game for the Skyforce.

Galatasaray (2020–2021)
On July 24, 2020, Macon signed with Galatasaray of the Turkish Basketball Super League (BSL) and the Basketball Champions League.

AEK Athens (2021)
On January 29, 2021, Macon signed with AEK Athens of the Greek Basket League. Macon made his debut on February 6, 2021 against Peristeri, playing 28:09 minutes and scoring 18 points with 50% FG, 3 assists, 3 rebounds and 2 steals in the AEK 91–59 win. He ended the season with impressive averages of 18.2 points and 3.7 assists per game.

Panathinaikos (2021–2022)
On July 11, 2021, Macon signed with Panathinaikos of the Greek Basket League and the EuroLeague. In 31 Greek Basket League games, he averaged 11.8 points, 1.9 rebounds and 3.7 assists (with 1.8 turnovers), playing around 23 minutes per contest. Additionally, in 31 EuroLeague games, he averaged 13.1 points, 2.2 rebounds and 3.6 assists (with 2.2 turnovers), playing around 26 minutes per contest.

UNICS Kazan (2022–present)
On July 9, 2022, Macon signed a two-year (1+1) contract with Russian club UNICS Kazan of the VTB United League.

Career statistics

NBA

Regular season

|-
| style="text-align:left;"| 
| style="text-align:left;"| Dallas
| 8 || 0 || 11.3 || .370 || .455 || .571 || 1.5 || .9 || .1 || .0 || 3.6
|-
| style="text-align:left;"| 
| style="text-align:left;"| Miami
| 4 || 0 || 3.5 || .333 || .500 || – || .0 || .3 || .0 || .0 || .8
|- class="sortbottom"
| style="text-align:center;" colspan="2"| Career
| 12 || 0 || 8.7 || .367 || .462 || .571 || 1.0 || .7 || .1 || .0 || 2.7

References

External links
Arkansas Razorbacks bio

1995 births
Living people
21st-century African-American sportspeople
AEK B.C. players
African-American basketball players
American expatriate basketball people in Greece
American expatriate basketball people in Russia
American expatriate basketball people in Turkey
American men's basketball players
Arkansas Razorbacks men's basketball players
Basketball players from Arkansas
BC UNICS players
Dallas Mavericks players
Galatasaray S.K. (men's basketball) players
Holmes Community College alumni
Junior college men's basketball players in the United States
Miami Heat players
Panathinaikos B.C. players
Point guards
Shooting guards
Sioux Falls Skyforce players
Sportspeople from Little Rock, Arkansas
Texas Legends players
Undrafted National Basketball Association players